Level Up Project! is a series of Korean variety show featuring South Korean girl group Red Velvet. Currently, it spans over five different seasons.

Synopsis
Members visit different parts of the world in-between promotions. The first season takes place in Pattaya, Thailand, the second in Yeosu and the third in Slovenia. The fourth season, entitled Level Up Thrilling Project, takes place in Seoul. The fifth season takes place in Jeju.

Cast
 First season: Irene, Seulgi, Wendy and Yeri
 Second season: Irene, Seulgi, Wendy, Joy and Yeri
 Third season: Irene, Seulgi, Wendy, Joy and Yeri
 Fourth season: Irene and Seulgi, with Joy as a special guest.
 Fifth season: Irene, Seulgi, Wendy, Joy and Yeri

Series overview
<onlyinclude>

Broadcasting platforms

Korea
 Oksusu (Season 1-3)
 KBS Joy (Season 1)
 XtvN (Season 2)
 JTBC4 (Season 3)
 Wavve (Seasons 4-5)
 SM C&C Youtube (Season 4)

Thailand 
 True ID

Notes

References

Television series based on singers and musicians
Red Velvet (group)
Television series by SM C&C
XtvN original programming
Wavve original programming